On the Run is a flagship convenience store brand developed by ExxonMobil, used at Exxon and Mobil stations in the United States, BP and Mobil in Australia and at Esso and Mobil stations internationally. Alimentation Couche-Tard acquired the On the Run trademark and franchise network in the U.S. in 2009, and Parkland Fuel did the same in Canada in 2016; ExxonMobil retains full ownership of the brand in the rest of the world.

On the Run stores are described as larger and having more products than older-model convenience stores, featuring "fresh snacks, fill-in groceries, health & beauty supplies, plus quick meal options".

The name "On the Run" is used, untranslated, around the world. Locations in the Canadian province of Quebec utilize similar branding as "Marché Express"; Imperial Oil faced criticism in 2007 when it planned to rebrand the locations as On the Run (beginning with a new location at a Mount Royal Esso station), but threats of boycotts by the Saint-Jean-Baptiste Society, as well as sanctions from the Office québécois de la langue française (which enforces legal protections of the French language), caused the company to backtrack on this decision.

Divestments

On April 29, 2009, Canadian convenience store company Alimentation Couche-Tard, which operates stores in the United States under the Circle K name, acquired the 450-store On the Run franchise network (the stores themselves remain with local franchisees) plus 43 ExxonMobil-owned and operated stores in the Phoenix, Arizona area. Many of these stores have been converted to Circle K locations, and the On the Run brand is now only primarily seen in Missouri, Louisiana, and Maine.

In August 2011, 7-Eleven announced it was acquiring 51 ExxonMobil-owned and operated On the Run locations in the Dallas/Fort Worth area; the convenience stores were re-branded as 7-Eleven, but will still sell Exxon-branded gasoline. Houston-area On The Run locations (81 total) were rebranded either as a Timewise (Landmark Industries) or Star Stop (the retail division of Panjwani Energy LLC) convenience store since 7-Eleven does not operate franchises in the Houston Metro area.

In 2016, Imperial Oil began to divest its retail locations in Canada; various Esso locations in Ontario and Quebec were sold to Couche-Tard (being rebranded as Circle K and Couche-Tard), and 7-Eleven acquired 148 locations in Alberta and British Columbia for $2.8 billion. Parkland Fuel acquired the remaining On the Run/Marché Express franchise network and associated trademarks in Canada, and has since begun to utilize the brand (including a refreshed version of the concept introduced 2018) in conjunction with its own retail brands (such as Pioneer).

Operations

Australia 

On The Run (now known as OTR) is an umbrella brand of 24-hour convenience stores coupled with service stations owned and operated by the family-owned Peregrine Corporation. Peregrine founder Fred Shahin opened his first service station and various other tobacco outlets in 1984. The company now owns over 160 sites across South Australia and Victoria. Although the sites were originally branded Mobil, they initially switched to On the Run branding (with minor acknowledgement of selling Mobil fuels", then to OTR branding, with a switch to BP fuels.

Many OTR outlets operate alongside other brands such as Subway, Wok in a Box, Oporto, Hungry Jack's, Guzman y Gomez and Krispy Kreme.

OTR has also developed and launched a series of proprietary food and drinks brands to sell through their stores. These include C Coffee, Moe's Dog & Shake, OhJ!, CHILL and EAT.

OTR has also established an innovative charitable program called OTRGive in June 2018. Charities who've benefitted from OTR Give include Foodbank, Guide Dogs SA/NT, CFS Foundation, Variety, Canteen, Royal Flying Doctor Service and RSPCA.

In 2018, On The Run became the inaugural title sponsor of the Supercars Championship event The Bend SuperSprint at the Peregrine-owned The Bend Motorsport Park.

Ireland 
Ireland previously had On the Run stores located in Esso stations however they were rebranded after Exxon sold their Irish petrol stations to Topaz which was later sold to Couche Tard with the forecourts rebranded to Circle K. Many of them had a food company called Nine-One-One in them, but they were ordered by the High Court to withdraw in 32 stores.

United Kingdom 
Esso's company-operated convenience stores in the UK were run through ROC UK, a subsidiary of Esso Petroleum Company Limited and ExxonMobil. Initially branded Snack & Shop, the stores were gradually converted to the On The Run format after Exxon acquired Mobil.  Between 2011 and 2015 Esso/ROC sold off 359 of its company outlets in regional tranches to three large independent operators - Euro Garages, MRH (GB), and Rontec, although it continued to supply them with Esso branded fuel through an independent wholesaler, Greenergy. None of the new owners continued to use On the Run.  Euro Garages mainly used third party names, notably Spar and - for food offerings -  Greggs, Subway, Burger King and KFC; MRH used a mix of third party names and its own Hursts C-store branding; and Rontec initially mainly used its own Shop'n Drive name, but occasionally Spar and a discount format, Family Shopper. Esso retained ownership of around 200 sites that have Tesco Express stores where the site is leased to Tesco but sells Esso branded fuel.

Egypt 
In Egypt, On the Run convenience stores are located at Mobil stations in Cairo, Giza and Alexandria. They are open 24 hours, 7 days a week.

Controversies 

Redevelopment of an On The Run Store dumped 2,000 tonnes (2,200 short tons) of contaminated carcinogenic soil in the Adelaide Hills. For this sustained breach of law, fines of $28,000 were levied against the operators of On The Run and associated business, Nasmin Pty Ltd.

Nasmin Pty Ltd was fined A$28,000 for the dumping of 2,000 tonnes of soil on its farm taken from the redevelopment of an On The Run store, some of it slightly contaminated.

In 2018, the chain received criticism from consumers and environmental groups for a decision to ban reusable coffee cups due to a contamination incident at one of their regional stores, amongst growing concerns of the negative effect of the 1.2 billion disposable cups that end up in landfill in Australia each year. However new food safety procedures were introduced and OTR reinstated their policy to accept reusable cups in September 2018.

A class action on behalf of 1,050 On The Run workers was lodged with the Australian Federal Court on 13 May 2020. The company was accused of failing to pay overtime, underpaying staff and misusing its traineeship program as a method to reduce workers' pay, dating back to 2014 and involving all stores in South Australia. OTR allegedly used eight different wage minimisation tactics that enabled gross underpayment of its staff. In March 2020, the Federal Court had upheld a separate decision by South Australia's Employment Tribunal to award  to an OTR employee who had been underpaid.

In 2020 there was opposition by local residents to a planned OTR outlet on Kensington Road in Kensington Park, and to the expansion of the Peregrine headquarters building in Kensington to a height of seven storeys with a helipad on top of the building.

In August 2020 Peregrine was ordered by the South Australian Employment Tribunal to pay  to an employee after being found to have deliberately underpaid him over the period of about a year in 2016, at an OTR at Fulham.

Awards 

In 2003, On the Run was named Chain of the Year by Convenience Store Decisions (CSD) magazine.  In 2007, the chain was again recognized by CSD with the Best in Class Foodservice Award for its line of proprietary gourmet breakfast sandwiches under the On the Run Cafe brand name.

Australia

In 2018, Peregrine Corporation won the Australian Retail Awards ‘2018 Large Retailer of the Year’ award which recognises the outstanding business outcomes of Australian retailers who continue to adapt, improve and innovate in their field.

In 2019, OTR won ‘Large Employer of the Year’ in South Australian Training Awards.

See also 
 Mac's Convenience Stores
 Circle K
 Imperial Oil
 Mobil

References

External links 

 

Convenience stores of the United States
ExxonMobil subsidiaries
ExxonMobil brands
Retail companies established in 1984
Convenience stores of Canada
Alimentation Couche-Tard